The 1956 Wichita Shockers football team, sometimes known as the Wheatshockers, was an American football team that represented Wichita  University (now known as Wichita State University) as a member of the Missouri Valley Conference during the 1956 NCAA University Division football season. In its second and final season under head coach Pete Tillman, the team compiled a 4–6 record (1–3 against conference opponents), finished in fourth place in the MVC, and was outscored by a total of 198 to 117. The team played its home games at Veterans Field, now known as Cessna Stadium.

Schedule

References

Wichita
Wichita State Shockers football seasons
Wichita Shockers football